Yves Rénier (29 September 1942 – 24 April 2021) was a French actor, director, screenwriter, and voice actor, best known for starring in the long running television series Commissaire Moulin (1976-2006). The cause of his death, in France at age 78, was revealed by his wife to have been due to a heart attack. He reportedly suffered from a cardiac ailment, for which he'd undergone surgery three years prior to his death.

He was the son of dramatist Max Régnier.

Filmography

Actor

Director

Theater

Dubbing

Author

Notes

External links 
 

1942 births
2021 deaths
People from Bern
French male film actors
French film directors
French male screenwriters
French screenwriters
20th-century French male actors
21st-century French male actors
20th-century French screenwriters